Right Side Up is an album  by Ralph McTell released in 1976 by Warner Bros. Records/WEA, recorded at Air Studios in London by Pete Henderson and Mike Stavrou, and produced by Ralph McTell and Peter Swettenham (one-time member of band Grapefruit).

Musicians who appear on the album include Danny Thompson, (double bass), John Stevens and Pick Withers - (drums) -  Rod Clements (of Lindisfarne), - Dave Pegg (from Fairport Convention), bass players.  Backing vocals were provided by Tony Rivers - of The Castaways - Ken Gold and John Perry (also one-time member of band Grapefruit).  John Martyn played guitar on "River Rising".

Track listing
All tracks composed by Ralph McTell; except where indicated

Side One
 "San Diego Serenade" (Tom Waits) 2:45
 "Naomi" - 3:07
 "Tequila Sunset" - 3:22
 "Weather the Storm" - 4:01
 "River Rising" - 3:57

Side Two
 "From Clare to Here" - 4:13
 "Chairman and the Little Man" - 2:09
 "Country Boys" - 2:32
 "Slow Burning Companion" - 3:28
 "Nightmares" - 2:55
 "May You Never" (John Martyn) - 3:25

 "Song for Ireland" (additional track, learnt by McTell from the version by Dick Gaughan, written by Phil Colclough originally released in 1982, added to re-release of the album)

Track notes
 "San Diego Serenade": McTell - "I've always admired Tom Waits writing for both his melody and his wonderfully evocative lyrics."
 "Weather the Storm":McTell - "It remains one of my most requested pieces in live work."
 "From Clare to Here": McTell - "A chance remark from a fellow building site labourer remembered from 1963 as " it's a long way from Clare to here." 
 "Country Boys": McTell: "Cornwall was in my mind when I wrote this, and Ry Cooder was on everybody's turntable."
 "May You Never": McTell - "John Martyn has written so many beautiful songs, but I guess this is still my favourite."

Personnel
Ralph McTell - vocals, acoustic guitar
John Martyn - electric guitar on "River Rising"
Dave Pegg, Rod Clements - bass guitar
Danny Thompson - acoustic bass
Sam Mitchell - dobro
Graham Preskett - keyboards, string arrangements
Peter Swettenham - keyboards
John Stevens, Pick Withers - drums, percussion
John Perry, Ken Gold, Tony Rivers - backing vocals
Technical
Mike Stavrou, Peter Henderson - mixing
Mike Dymond - photography

References

External links
Allmusic album review

Ralph McTell albums
1976 albums
Warner Records albums
Albums recorded at AIR Studios